"Christmas Alphabet" is a Christmas song written by Buddy Kaye and Jules Loman, first released in 1954 by The McGuire Sisters. The melody is taken from Skidamarink, the final song of the Broadway production The Echo.

In 1955 a cover version recorded by Dickie Valentine and produced by Dick Rowe became a Christmas number one hit in the UK Singles Chart. It first entered the UK chart on 25 November 1955, where it spent seven weeks, three of which were at No. 1.

In the song various things the singer associates with Christmas are listed alphabetically. It is notable for being the first UK Christmas chart topper that is actually about Christmas, a trend that would continue on and off over the next several decades.

References

1955 singles
1955 songs
American Christmas songs
Songs about language
The McGuire Sisters songs
Songs with lyrics by Buddy Kaye
UK Singles Chart number-one singles
Christmas number-one singles in the United Kingdom